Fiji was represented at the 2006 Commonwealth Games in Melbourne.

Medals

Gold

Silver

Bronze
 Rugby 7s

Nations at the 2006 Commonwealth Games
2006 in Fiji
Fiji at the Commonwealth Games